Scutellaria hastifolia is a species of flowering plant belonging to the family Lamiaceae.

Its native range is Europe to Western Siberia and Caucasus.

References

hastifolia